Sherry is a type of wine.

Sherry may also refer to:

Arts and entertainment
 Sherry (1920 film), an American drama directed by Edgar Lewis
 "Sherry" (song), a 1962 song written by Bob Gaudio and performed by The Four Seasons
 Sherry!, a 1967 musical by Laurence Rosenthal and James Lipton
 The Sherrys, a 1960s American girl group
 "Oh Sherrie", a song by Steve Perry on the 1984 album Street Talk
 Sherry Birkin, one of the main protagonists in the game Resident Evil 2, besides Claire Redfield
 Sherry Palmer, a fictional character on the television series 24
 Sherry (The Walking Dead), a fictional character in The Walking Dead

Other uses
 Sherry (name), a list of people with the given name or surname
 Sherry, Wisconsin, a town and unincorporated community
 Sherry's, a defunct restaurant in New York City

See also
 Chari (disambiguation)
 Chéri (disambiguation)
 Cheri (disambiguation)
 Cherie (disambiguation)
 Cherrie, a given name and surname
 Cherry (disambiguation)
 Shari (disambiguation)
 Sheri (disambiguation)
 Sherie, a given name
 Sherri (disambiguation)
 Sherrie, a given name
 Shery (born 1985), Guatemalan Latin pop singer and songwriter